1967 Emperor's Cup Final was the 47th final of the Emperor's Cup competition. The final was played at National Stadium in Tokyo on January 14, 1968. Toyo Industries won the championship.

Overview
Toyo Industries won their 2nd title, by defeating Mitsubishi Motors 1–0.

Match details

See also
1967 Emperor's Cup

References

Emperor's Cup
Emperor's Cup Final
Emperor's Cup Final
Emperor's Cup Final
Sanfrecce Hiroshima matches
Urawa Red Diamonds matches